Ümit Bilican (born 29 March 1981) is a Belgian professional footballer who has played for several clubs in Europe.

Club career
Born in Heusden-Zolder, Bilican began playing football with Belgian Pro League side Lommel. Bilican had a spell in the Turkish Super Lig with Adanaspor and seasons in the Belgian First Division with K.F.C. Lommel S.K.

References

External links
 Guardian's Stats Centre

1981 births
Living people
People from Heusden-Zolder
Belgian footballers
Belgian people of Turkish descent
Adanaspor footballers
Süper Lig players
K.F.C. Lommel S.K. players
Association football forwards
Footballers from Limburg (Belgium)
Expatriate footballers in Turkey
Belgian expatriate footballers
Belgian expatriate sportspeople in Turkey